The 2008 First Division season was the 40th of the amateur competition of the first-tier football in the Gambia.  The competition was governed by the Gambian Football Association (GFA) .  The season began on February 24 and finished on July 13.  The Real de Banjul won the tenth title after finishing with 39 points and qualified into the 2009 CAF Champions League the following season. Wallidan FC was also winner of the 2008 Gambian Cup, runner up was Samger, not even that club qualified and competed in the 2009 CAF Confederation Cup due to financial problems.  It was the first season featuring twelve clubs, up from ten last season.  The last two positions received relegation into the GFA League Second Division in the following season, they were the Gambia Ports Authority (GPA) and Interior FC.

Overview
The season featured a total of 132 matches and scored a total of 186, more than last season.

Real de Banjul was the defending team of the title. Wallidan scored the most numbering 25, second were Samger and the Hawks with 22.

Participating clubs

 Wallidan FC
 Steve Biko FC
 Real de Banjul
 Sea View FC
 Interior FC - Promoted from the Second Division
 Samger FC - Promoted from the Second Division

 Hawks FC
 Gambia Ports Authority FC
 Armed Forces FC
 Bakau United
 Sait Matty FC
 Gamtel FC

League standings

See also
GFA League First Division

Footnotes

External links
Historic results at rsssf.com

Gambia
Gambia
GFA League First Division seasons
First